The Australian national cricket team played three Test matches in India against the India national cricket team in 1964-65. The three-Test series was drawn, with the Australians taking the first Test, the Indians winning the second, and the third match drawn.

Series summary

1st Test

2nd Test

3rd Test

References

External links
 

1964 in Australian cricket
1964 in Indian cricket
1965 in Australian cricket
1965 in Indian cricket
1964-65
Indian cricket seasons from 1945–46 to 1969–70
International cricket competitions from 1960–61 to 1970